This is a list of notable pizzerias in Australia.

Pizzerias in Australia

Independent pizzerias
 Beppi's Restaurant – first pizzeria established in Sydney, New South Wales
 Toto's Pizza House – first pizzeria established in Melbourne, Victoria 
 Totti's – a pizzeria established in Bondi, New South Wales, Australia

Chain restaurants
Current
 Crust Pizza - Australian pizza chain specialising in gourmet pizza, has over 120 stores across Australia, as well as locations in New Zealand and Singapore.
 Domino's Pizza Enterprises – an Australian company that holds the master franchise for the Domino's Pizza brand in Australia, New Zealand, France, Belgium, Netherlands, Monaco and Japan.
 Pizza Capers – Australian fast food chain specializing in pizza, based in Queensland that has over 110 stores throughout Australia.
 Pizza Hut - An international US brand operating in Australia.
 La Porchetta, a pizza chain originating in Melbourne and also operating in New Zealand 

Former
 Eagle Boys – was an Australian fast food chain specialising in pizza with 210 stores throughout Australia, particularly in regional areas. Was acquired by Pizza Hut, with some stores closing and others rebranded as Pizza Hut restaurants.
 Pizza Haven – Australian and New Zealand restaurant chain and franchise operation specialising in pizza. Later bought by Eagle Boys, which was then purchased by Pizza Hut.
 Pizza Showtime – was a family restaurant and entertainment center operating in Perth, Western Australia from 1980 to around 1984.
 Little Caesars - An American chain, that launched locally in 2014 and had 14 restaurants across New South Wales when it went into administration in October 2019, all Locations closed as of December 2019.

See also

 List of companies of Australia
 List of fast food restaurant chains in Australia
 List of pizza chains
 List of restaurant chains in Australia

References

 
Lists of restaurants
Lists of companies of Australia
Australian cuisine-related lists